Arthroleptis nikeae, also known as Nike's squeaker, is a species of frogs in the family Arthroleptidae. It is endemic to the Mafwemiro Reserve in the Rubeho Mountains of Tanzania. It was named after conservationist Nike Doggart, who first found it.

Description
Females grow to a snout–vent length . The dorsum is brown with a dark inter-orbital bar and two dark chevrons. The limbs have dark crossbars. The fingers and the toes have expanded discs. The tympanum is distinct but small, about half of the eye diameter.

Habitat and conservation
While it occurs in a forest reserve, the area is not well protected and forest loss is occurring there.

References

Critically endangered animals
nikeae
Frogs of Africa
Amphibians of Tanzania
Endemic fauna of Tanzania
Amphibians described in 2003
Taxonomy articles created by Polbot